Eddy-K was a Cubaton/Reggaeton group from Cuba.

Eddy-K was at the beginning a duo with "Eddy" (Eduardo Mora Hernández) and  "K" Leyden. In August 1998 the singer of rap music "Jorgito" (Jorge Francisco Hernández Carvajal) joined them.

Kleidis left the band a short time after. The band became larger after with the arrival of the singer "Deep Drama" (Damian Aguirre Perez) in 2000, and "DJ Tony" (José Antonio Suárez Torres) in November 2001.

They made the music of the television show of Cuban television "La Otra Geografía, did a world tour with "La Charanga Habanera y Las Voces de Cuba" (Vania, Osdalgia & Halia) (in the place of Halia), and did the first part of the concert of Don Omar in Cancún.

One of their more known songs is La Habana me queda chiquita, a remake of the band of timba Pachito Alonso y su Kini Kini, with Christian and Rey Alonso.

The song Aquí están los cuatro has become number 3 in the "hit-parade" of the American magazine "Latinos Unidos".

During 2006, the group released a number of songs, including two duets with other Cuban artists - 
Entrale, with the Cuban diva Haila, and
Llegate, with Charanga Habanera.

In early 2008, Eduardo Mora and DJ Tony left Cuba and resettled in Miami. Damian and Jorgito have since gone on to form a new group in Cuba, known as Los 4 (Los Salvajes).

Mora has continued using the "Eddy K" name. Later in 2010 he started working with Music Producer/Artist Sharo Torres and right away they started producing what is now known as his latest production called "CubanStyle". He is most famous for his mix of salsa and Cuban Reggaeton (cubaton). Eddy K released a new production in 2014 called "La Academia" which with multiple collaborations with Puerto Rican Artist and more.

Eddy K has a music career spanning over 20 years, where in this time he alongside other Cuban artists helped create the Cuban version of Reggaeton named Cubaton. In 2008 he moved to the sunny city of Miami being the first Cuban Urban artist to emigrate looking for a broader horizon where he began working on his international music career. While in Miami, Eddy K has made hits such as (“Tierra Caliente feat. Gente de Zona”, “ Pa’ Partirte En 2”, “Blanca feat. Farruko & “Regalame Otra Noche” feat. Fuego. In 2021 his new album titled Dale V will be released.

Discography

United States
Eddy K "La Academia" released on iTunes November 17, 2014 by Mayimba Music, Inc. Producer: Sharo Torres

Intro
Todo el Mundo Activao
Quiere Bailar
Modela Que Yo Voy Atrás (feat. Poesia Urbana)
Si Ella No Me Quiere
Quiere Seguir
Contra el Tráfico (feat. Sammy la Sensacion)
Dilo en Mi Cara
Déjame Entrar
No Creo en el Amor (feat. Lenier)
Pa Partirte en Dos (feat. Mr. D.)
Le Dolia
Dale Lo Que Pida
Se Acaba Orita
El Dueño del Party (feat. Ephrem J)

Eddy K "CubanStyle" (2011)
Intro
El Tracketeo
La Infladora Feat Chacal
Dale La Pata
Dice Que Yo
Dame Un Break (Brey)
Pa Partirte En Dos Feat Mr D
Entrame Por El Tubo
La Web Cam
Se Acabo El Amor Feat Vanessa Formell
Siempre Esta Pegao
Calentando El Evento
El Pudin (Remix) Feat Osmany Garcia & Jose El Pillo
Cual Es El Mirar Feat El Mola
Vine Con To
La Cenicienta Feat El Mola
Gracias

Asalto (Premium Latin Music, 2009)
Intro
La Super Estrella  
Diselo a Mami (feat. Maikol y el Karo)  
Bandolero  
Sientelo (feat. Vanessa Formell)  
Mami Besame 
Asalto
No Entiendo 
No Me Interesa (feat. El Mola)  
Sale 
No Hay Otro Como Yo 
La Fiesta (feat. Isaac Delgado) 
Billete de 100   
Cuentalo (feat. Gianco) 
Que Clase de Problema
Mami Besame

Cuba
Llegaron Los Salvajes (2007) Released on iTunes: Sep 18, 2007
Intro
El Chacal
Me Vuelves Loco
Al Doblar de la Esquina
Apagón Total
A Ella le Gusta el Party
Hablale por Mi
Activao
La Gente Que Me Quiere
Soy Tu Dueño
No Sigas Mirandome
Llegaron los Salvajes
El Castigador
No para de Moverse
Mami No Me Cuelgues
Pero Que No Se Entere
Ellas Son Dos
Amigos

Aqui estan los cuatro (Ahí Namá / Sony-BMG Italy, 2004)
Opening No. 1
Sabes quién llegó
A mi tu no me engañas
Ellos no saben na'
Llorando
Llegó la escuela
Aqui están los cuatro
Contra la pared
Me contaron
Me están mirando
No me hables de moral
Déjala que siga
Mujeres
Quieren tirarme
Son celos
Ven, conéctate
Que no me vengan diciendo
El genio de la lámpara

References

External links
websites MySpace : officialeddyk, eddykmadeincuba
Page web site Ahi-Nama
Page clip "Aqui estan los cuatro"
Eddy-K interview.
Eddy-K on Cubamusic.com

Cuban musical groups
Cuban reggaeton musicians